Himmelpforten is a former Samtgemeinde ("collective municipality") in the district of Stade, in Lower Saxony, Germany. Its seat was in the village Himmelpforten. It was disbanded on 1 January 2014, when it was merged with the Samtgemeinde Oldendorf to form the new Samtgemeinde Oldendorf-Himmelpforten.

The Samtgemeinde Himmelpforten consisted of the following municipalities:
Düdenbüttel 
Engelschoff 
Großenwörden 
Hammah 
Himmelpforten

Former Samtgemeinden in Lower Saxony